Raymond Roseliep (August 11, 1917 – December 6, 1983) was a poet and contemporary master of the English haiku and a Catholic priest. He has been described as "the John Donne of Western haiku."

Early life 
Born on August 11, 1917, in Farley, Iowa, to John Albert Roseliep (1874-1939) and Anna Elizabeth Anderson (1884-1967). In 1939 he graduated from Loras College with a Bachelor of Arts, in 1948 he received a Master of Arts in English from Catholic University of America, and in 1954 he received a Doctor of Philosophy in English Literature from Notre Dame University. He was ordained, June 12, 1943, at St. Raphael’s Cathedral, Dubuque, Iowa.

Poetry 
He won the Haiku Society of America Harold G. Henderson award in 1977 and 1982. In 1981, Roseliep's haiku sequence, “The Morning Glory”, appeared on over two thousand buses in New York City:
takes in
the world
from the heart out

funnels
our day
into itself

closes
on its own
inner light

Bibliography
 The Linen Bands - 1961
 The Small Rain - 1963
 Love Makes the Air Light - 1965
 Flute Over Walden - 1976
 Walk in Love - 1976
 Light Footsteps - 1976 
 A Beautiful Woman Moves with Grace - 1976
 Sun in His Belly - 1977
 Step on the Rain - 1977
 Wake to the Bell - 1977
 A Day in the Life of Sobi-Shi - 1978 
 Sailing Bones - 1978 
 Sky in My Legs - 1979
 Firefly in My Eyecup - 1979 
 The Still Point – Haiku of Mu - 1979
 Listen to Light - 1980
 Swish of a Cow Tail - 1982
 Rabbit in the Moon, Alembic Press (November 1983) 
 The Earth We Swing On - 1984

See also
 Elizabeth Searle Lamb

References
 David Dayton, ed. (1980) A Roseliep Retrospective: Poems & Other Words By & About Raymond Roseliep. Ithaca, New York: Alembic Press

External links
Selected Roseliep haiku
An academic analysis of the poems of Roseliep
A chronology of Roseliep's life

English-language haiku poets
People from Dubuque County, Iowa
Poets from Iowa
Roman Catholic writers
Catholic poets
Loras College alumni
Catholic University of America alumni
University of Notre Dame alumni
1917 births
1983 deaths
20th-century American poets
Writers from Dubuque, Iowa
Catholics from Iowa
20th-century American Roman Catholic priests